Jim P. Zheng is a professor at the Department of Electrical Engineering at Florida State University.  A researcher on the design, manufacture and uses nanomaterials in the energy area, Dr. Zheng owns the patent on a buckypaper polymer fuel cell production technique that is licensed to Bing Energy.  He has received National Research Council Fellow Award in 1993, Army Research & Development Achievement Award in 1997, NASA Faculty Research Award in 1999, and Progress Energy Professional Development Award in 2005.

References  
http://tradeandindustrydev.com/region/florida/news/fl-bing-energy-inc-bei-has-selected-tallahassee-company%E2%80%99s-world-headquarters-484
http://www.tgdaily.com/sustainability-features/54442-researchers-design-new-hydrogen-fuel-cell

Florida State University faculty